Rogel Nachum (or Nahum, ; born 21 May 1967) is a retired Israeli triple jumper, whose personal best was 17.20 meters, achieved in June 1992 in Seville.

Nachum participated in three Olympic Games: Barcelona 1992, Atlanta 1996, Sydney 2000 where he carried the Israeli flag at opening ceremony.

At the 1989 Maccabiah Games, he won the triple jump in 55' 0 1/4", and was then recruited for Kansas State University by U.S. T&F coach Steve Miller.

In 1990 he held the Israeli records in three events: high jump 2.18 m', long jump 7.73 m' and triple jump 16.89 m'.

Rogel's records are:
 Triple Jump: 17.20 m' (17.31 m' wind 2.3)
 Long Jump: 7.96 m'
 High Jump: 2.18 m'

He is the current coach of Israel's Hanna Knyazyeva-Minenko.

Achievements

Tests

Lifting
 Clean: 140 kg
 Hang clean 145 kg
 Snatch: 97.5 kg
 Half squat: 270 kg (on a bench)

Jumping
 Standing long jump: 3.39 m'
 Standing triple jump: 10.57 m'
 Standing 5 steps: 18.58 m'
 Standing 10 steps: 38.70 m'
 Standing high jump: 1.70 m'
 High jump with 2 legs: 2.03 m'
 Standing steps for 100 m': 26.5 steps

See also
List of Israeli records in athletics
List of Maccabiah records in athletics

References

External links
 

1967 births
Living people
Israeli male triple jumpers
Athletes (track and field) at the 1992 Summer Olympics
Athletes (track and field) at the 1996 Summer Olympics
Athletes (track and field) at the 2000 Summer Olympics
Olympic athletes of Israel
Israeli Jews